The Sopo River is a river in South Sudan's state of Western Bahr el Ghazal.

Course

The Sopo river rises on the border with the Central African Republic, and flows in a generally northeast direction past the town of  Sopo. to join the Boro River on the border with Northern Bahr el Ghazal.
The combined stream is the Magadhik River, which in turn joins the Chel River to form the Lol River, a tributary of the Bahr al-Arab.

See also
List of rivers of South Sudan

External links
Sopo River

References

Western Bahr el Ghazal
Bahr el Ghazal
Rivers of South Sudan